Balaji Sakthivel is an Indian director of Tamil films. He is best known for directing the 2004 film, Kaadhal.

Career
Balaji Sakthivel began as an assistant director to S. Shankar. In 2002, he directed his first film, Samurai for Vikram. After a two-year break, he released Kaadhal (2004) under the S Pictures banner, the production house of Shankar. In 2007, Kalloori has won Tamil Nadu State Film Award for Best Dialogue Writer. His Vazhakku Enn 18/9 (2012) won the National Film Award for Best Feature Film in Tamil.

Balaji Sakthivel is making his onscreen debut in Dhanush's Asuran. Even before the release of the film, the director has bagged his next acting role in Mani Ratnam's next production  Vaanam Kottatum (2020). He has been roped in to play an important role in the film directed by Dhana. He has been signed to play one of the important characters in Mani Ratnam's Ponniyin Selvan: I (2022).

Filmography

References

External links

Tamil film directors
Tamil-language film directors
Tamil screenwriters
Living people
1964 births
21st-century Indian film directors
People from Dindigul district
Film directors from Tamil Nadu
Screenwriters from Tamil Nadu